Miss France 2023 was the 93rd edition of the Miss France pageant. The competition was held on 17 December 2022 at M.A.CH 36 in Châteauroux, Centre-Val de Loire. Diane Leyre of Île-de-France crowned Indira Ampiot of Guadeloupe as her successor at the end of the event. 

The 2023 edition marked the first year that Cindy Fabre had overseen Miss France as its national director, taking over from Sylvie Tellier, whom had served in the position since 2007.

Background

Location
In May 2022, it was announced that Miss France 2023 was scheduled to be held at M.A.CH 36 in Châteauroux, Centre-Val de Loire in December 2022. This marked the second time the city hosted the competition, following Miss France 2018. The date of the competition was tentatively set to 17 December 2022, although there was a possibility of it being changed due to the 2022 FIFA World Cup.

Also in May 2022, it was announced that the annual overseas trip for the delegates would be to Guadeloupe. Guadeloupe was originally planned to be the location of the overseas trip for Miss France 2021, until the onset of the COVID-19 pandemic. The delegates visited Guadeloupe for a variety of events, before arriving in Châteauroux to begin rehearsals.

Selection of contestants
The 2023 edition saw the partition of Languedoc-Roussillon into the individual regions of Languedoc and Roussillon, the first time that the region sent two separate representatives since 2016. Additionally, the region of Saint Martin and Saint Barthélemy returned; Saint Martin and Saint Barthélemy last competed in 2020, and typically competes on a biennial basis. Mayotte  withdrew from the competition, following the resignation of its regional director and the inability to find a replacement. This was the first year that Mayotte has been absent since its debut in 2000.

The 2023 edition also marked the first edition where women of any age; married, divorced, and widowed women; women with children; and women with tattoos or non-ear piercings were eligible to compete at Miss France.

Results

Special awards

Scoring

Preliminaries
A jury composed of partners (internal and external) of the Miss France Committee selected fifteen delegates during an interview that took place on 14 December to advance to the semifinals.

Top 15
In the top fifteen, a 50/50 split vote between the official jury and voting public selected five delegates to advance to the top five. Each delegate was awarded an overall score of 1 to 15 from the jury and public, and the five delegates with the highest combined scores advanced to the top five. The delegates with the sixth and seventh highest combined scores were afterwards designated as the fifth and sixth runners-up, respectively, despite not advancing in the competition. In the case of a tie, the jury vote prevailed.

Top five
In the top five, a 50/50 split vote between the official jury and voting public determined which contestant was declared Miss France. This was the third year that voting was conducted this way, following a rule change in the 2021 edition. Each contestant was ranked from first to fifth by the jury and public, and the two scores were combined to create a total score. In the case of a tie, the public vote prevailed.

Pageant

Format
On 18 November, it was announced in a press conference that the theme for this edition of the competition would be cinéma des Miss, with competition rounds being inspired by various films.

The competition opened with an introduction themed after Titanic, with a guest appearance from Diane Leyre. The 30 contestants were initially separated into three groups, each consisting of ten contestants, with each group taking part in an initial presentation round. The three presentation rounds were themed after Rocketman, Harry Potter, and The Avengers, respectively. Afterwards, the 30 contestants presented their regional costumes, created by local designers from their home regions, in a round inspired by Alice in Wonderland. The 30 contestants subsequently participated in the one-piece swimsuit round, inspired by Amélie.

After that, the Top 15 were announced in a round inspired by the Academy Awards, and they then competed in a second swimsuit round inspired by A View to a Kill. The Top 15 later appeared with Carla Bruni and Gims, for a performance of their song "Demain." Afterwards, the Top 5 were announced and presented their evening gowns in a round inspired by Skyfall. After the final question round, the Top 5 participated in their final presentation round, inspired by Maleficent, also featuring a guest appearance from Leyre, before the final results were revealed.

Judges
The judges were announced on 1 December 2022. 

Camille Lellouche was originally scheduled to serve as a judge, but resigned on 16 December for personal reasons, and was replaced by Krief.
Francis Huster (President of the Jury) – actor and director
Clarisse Agbegnenou – judoka
Dominique Besnehard – actor and film producer
Arnaud Ducret – actor and comedian
Kendji Girac – singer
Bérengère Krief – actress and comedian
Marine Lorphelin – Miss France 2013 from Burgundy

Contestants
The 30 contestants were:

Notes

References

External links

December 2022 events in France
Miss France
2022 beauty pageants
Beauty pageants in France
Entertainment events in France
Competitions in France